Kinley McNicoll (born April 17, 1994) is a former Canadian soccer player. She played as a defender and/ or midfielder for the Seattle Sounders Women  and the Canadian women's national soccer team.

Early life
Born in Oakville, Ontario, Kinley attended White Oaks Secondary School. She was a member of the school's honour roll for all four years she attended.

Playing career

International
Kinley made her senior international debut for the Canada women's national soccer team in 2015 at the Pan-American Games.

References

External links
 
 Wisconsin Badgers player profile

1994 births
Living people
Canada women's international soccer players
Canadian women's soccer players
USL W-League (1995–2015) players
Seattle Sounders Women players
Soccer people from Ontario
Sportspeople from Oakville, Ontario
Women's association football defenders
Wisconsin Badgers women's soccer players
Ottawa Fury (women) players
Toronto Lady Lynx players